The DJI Mavic is a series of teleoperated compact quadcopter drones for personal and commercial aerial photography and videography use, released by the Chinese technology company DJI.

Mini series

Mavic Mini and Mini SE

DJI announced the Mavic Mini on October 30, 2019 as a replacement for the now discontinued DJI Spark and positioning it as a beginner camera drone. Its camera is on a three-axis gimbal and features a 12MP sensor capable of 2.7K video at 30 FPS. The Mavic Mini shares similar design characteristics with the Mavic Pro and Mavic 2 series, though notable for its portability and overall small size. In Japan, a model was released with a smaller battery weighing  less, to come in under Japan's similar  limit. It has a range of 4 km as it uses Enhanced Wifi. Installed camera identifies in Exif as FC7203.

DJI Mini SE, released mid-2021, is basically the original DJI Mini build in DJI Mini 2 shell. It has 30 minutes flight time, 12MP still camera, 2.7K video, and a 4 km transmission range as it uses Enhanced Wifi like the DJI Mavic Mini. Its main purpose was to be a successor for the old Dji Mini as the cheapest drone option.

Mini 2 and Mini 2 SE 

DJI Mini 2, released November 2020, improves upon the Mavic Mini with longer flight time (31 minutes) and the ability to record 4K footage. Weighing in at 249g, the Mini 2 can withstand level 5 winds. It has 5 quickshot modes, 3 panorama modes, HD, 2.7k and 4k video. It also has the ability to take raw 12MP photos. The DJI Mini 2 also uses Ocusync 2.0 giving it a max transmission range of 10 km. 

DJI released the Mini 2 SE on February 9th, 2023. It is basically a Mini 2 with a downgraded camera from 4K to a 2.7K. Everything else is basically similar to a Mini 2.

Mini 3 Pro and Mini 3

The DJI Mini 3 Pro, was made available on May 10, 2022.

On December 9, 2022, DJI released the Mini 3 which was a cheaper version of the Mini 3 Pro. The main differences were the removal of collision detection sensors and limited intelligent camera modes. It only has a 12MP camera mode and no possibility to change color profiles. On the controller side, the DJI Mini 3 uses Ocusync 2.0 instead of O3 which is used in the DJI Mini 3 pro and downgrades the video transmission range and resolution to 720 from 1080p.

Air series

Mavic Air 

The Mavic Air, which was released in early 2018 can capture 4k video at 30 FPS. The Air has a 3-axis gimbal and 24mm lens. The Air also has a SmartCapture feature, a three-directional environment sensing system and a max flight time of 21 minutes.

It features a 12 MP 4K HDR camera, mounted on a 3-axis gimbal, and has a new panorama mode, which stitches together 25 photos in eight seconds to create a "Sphere Panorama". Due to antennas mounted on its landing gear, the drone has a 21-minute flight time and a 2.5 mile range. Like the Spark, the Air also features the "Smart Capture" mode, in which the drone can be controlled by hand gestures.

Mavic Air 2

DJI released the new Air series member known as Air 2 on April 27, 2020. Air 2 has a 1/2 inch CMOS camera, 34 min flight time per battery, can travel up to 68.4 km/h. 
The remote controller of Air 2 features a new design of the Mavic family. DJI's standard controller mounts a cellphone at the bottom, requiring the operator to look down while watching the screen. Detailed illustrations for the new controller show a mount that holds the smartphone at the top, more in line of view. This resembles the mounting on the controller for the Anafi, a Mavic Air competitor made by DJI's French rival, Parrot. The original Mavic Air uses an enhanced Wi-Fi radio control system. But the Mavic Air 2 upgrades to OcuSync 2.0, a dedicated radio system that runs in the 2.4 GHz and 5.8 GHz ranges (the system works in single and dual-band mode, 5.8 GHz is not supported in all regions). This promises less interference from ambient Wi-Fi networks. It also offers a better range of up to 10 kilometers.
In terms of filming, Air 2 supports RAW format, 48MP mode, HDR video, and Hyperlapse 240fps slow-motion mode. Mavic Air 2 has a safety feature that warns users about nearby planes and helicopters via its controller.

Air 2S 

The updated version of the Mavic Air 2, now rebranded DJI Air 2S, dropping the Mavic  name,  was unveiled by DJI on 15 April 2021 and was designed to feature improvements to the Mavic Air 2 released on April 27 2020. The Air 2S features a 1 inch CMOS camera capable of shooting 20-megapixel JPEG and RAW photos and up to 10-bit 5.4K video at a maximum frame of 30 FPS as well as 4K video at a maximum frame rate of 60 FPS. The drone also features a maximum flight time of 31 minutes, and allows up to 12km (7.45 mi) 1080p resolution transmission with OcuSync 3. Upgraded HDR capabilities are also included featuring 12.6 exposure stops for photos. DJI Air 2S also includes new photo and video modes such as SmartPhoto, Hyperlapse and MasterShots allowing more flexibility of the camera capabilities. Upgraded APAS 4.0 obstacle avoidance and detection system making use of sensors on the front, back, upwards and bottom of the drone are included.

Pro series

Mavic Pro and Pro Platinum

Announced in September 2016, the Mavic Pro, which was released in late 2016 was the first of the Mavic series. Top speed is 65 km/h (40 mph) in sport mode. The brand-new Ocusync transmission system can livestream video at a distance of 7 kilometers (4.3 miles) in 1080p. The Mavic Pro is equipped with the same camera as the Phantom 4 UAV, with a 78-degree field of view (FOV) instead of the Phantom's 94 degrees. The camera is a 12MP camera that is capable of shooting 4K video at 24 frames per second (FPS). It is capable of 96 FPS when shooting in 1080p. Its camera keeps the same 60 Mbit/s bitrate seen in the Phantom 4. The Mavic Pro folds small enough to fit into a small bag (83mm x 83mm x 198mm). Its legs and propellers fold underneath and to the side of the drone to form a compact package. 

At the August 2017 IFA trade show, DJI announced the upgraded Mavic Pro Platinum. The upgraded version includes better battery life and improved noise reduction due to new propellers and electronic speed controllers.

Mavic 2 Pro, 2 Zoom, 2 Enterprise, 2 Enterprise Dual and 2 Enterprise Advance

DJI announced in August 2018, the Mavic 2 Pro and the Mavic 2 Zoom. Both drones have 10 obstacle avoidance sensors on all sides and a max flight time of 31 minutes. Both of the drones could also record 4K video at 30 FPS.  The Mavic 2 Zoom has a 4× zoom feature (2× optical and 2× digital) and a 12-megapixel camera. The Mavic 2 Pro features a Hasselblad camera and Hyper Timelapse feature.

On October 29, 2018, DJI announced the Mavic 2 Enterprise Series (M2E). Incorporating features from the Mavic 2 line of consumer drones, the Mavic 2 Enterprise includes three modular accessories for both first responder and industrial applications. It includes the Spotlight, Speaker, and Beacon for making drones visible at night.

In December 2018, Mavic 2 Enterprise Dual is added to the lineup, incorporating thermal camera from FLIR.

In April 2021, Mavic 2 Enterprise Advanced is released. Bringing an improved thermal camera sensor, upgraded 48MP ½” camera sensor, and support for optional RTK (real-time kinematic) module.

Mavic 3, 3 Cine, 3 Classic, 3 Enterprise, 3 Thermal and 3 Multispectral   

The DJI Mavic 3, released on 5 November 2021, has a 4/3 CMOS Hasselblad L2D-20c camera and includes Hasselblad’s Natural Colour Solution (HNCS) technology. The camera has 12.8 stops of dynamic range and shoots up to 5.1k video. The transmission range has been improved on since the Mavic 2, increasing to 12km, as well as an increased flight time to 41 minutes, thanks to improved battery life.  Mavic 3 has a 4G accessory which is attached to the drone using a USB-c connection and which is then used to control the drone over a 4G mobile network.

On 27 September 2022 DJI released the enterprise series of DJI Mavic 3, which has either a thermal camera or a camera with a mechanical shutter. The drone has also an accessory USB-c port for adding an RTK module or speaker. The drone's zoom camera also has a higher digital zoom. Enterprise edition uses DJI RC Pro Enterprise controller, which is similar to DJI RC Pro but includes a microphone. The weight of the drone is 915 or 920g without accessories.

On 2 November 2022, DJI released the Mavic 3 Classic, which was similar to the original Mavic 3. The difference from the original Mavic 3 was that the classic had a lower price and did not have a secondary zoom camera. On 23 November 2022 DJI released Mavic 3M multispectral, which was enterprise edition but included RTK module and 5MP multispectral camera system instead of zoom.

Controllers 
 DJI Mavic Pro Controller (GL200A) with Ocusync 1.0 in 2016. *Discontinued.
 Supported devices:
 
 Mavic Pro Series.

 DJI Mavic Air Controller (S01A) with Enhanced WiFi in 2018. *Discontinued.
 Supported devices:
 
 Mavic Air.

 DJI Mavic 2 Controller (RC1A, RC1B) with Ocusync 2.0 in 2018. *Discontinued.
 Supported devices:
 
 Mavic 2 Series. 

 DJI Mavic Mini Controller (MR1SS5 and MR1SD25) with Enhanced WiFi in 2019. *Discontinued.
 In 2019, DJI launched two controllers for the new DJI Mavic Mini. DJI Mavic Mini Controllers are also compatible with DJI Mini SE launched in 2021.
 Supported devices:

 Mavic Mini.   
 Mini SE.

DJI Smart Controller (RM500) with Ocusync 2.0 and O3 in 2019. *Discontinued.
 Android based controller with an internal display and uses Ocusync 2.0 for video transmission. The device uses Rockchip RK3399 chipset and has 4GB RAM, 16GB of internal storage and 5.5" Full-HD 1920x1080px display. The device has HDMI output. The device can run 3rd-party apps. The weight of the controller is  630g. 
 Supported devices:

 Mini 2, Mavic Air 2, Mavic 2 Series. (Ocusync 2.0)
 Air 2S. (O3)

 DJI RC-N1 Controller (RC231) with Ocusync 2.0, O3 and O3+ in 2020.
 Stock controller which uses smartphones as a display and uses Ocusync 2.0, O3 and O3+ for video transmission. The weight of the controller is 387g.
Supported devices:
 Mini 2 Series, Mini 3 and Mavic Air 2. (Ocusync 2.0)
 Mini 3 Pro and Air 2S. (O3)
 Mavic 3 Series. (O3+) 

 DJI RC Pro Controller (RM510) with O3 and O3+ in 2021.
 Android-based dedicated controller. It has an internal display and uses O3 and O3+ for video transmission. Device uses Qualcomm Snapdragon 865 chipset with 6GB RAM, 32GB of internal storage and  5.5" Full-HD 1920x1080p display. It has an HDMI-output. It is possible to add 4G modem to the controller as an add-on. The device can run 3rd-party apps The weight of the controller is 680g.
Supported devices:
 
 Mini 3 Pro and Air 2S. (O3)
 Mavic 3 Series. (O3+) 

DJI RC Controller (RM330) with Ocusync 2.0, O3 and 03+ in 2022.
Successor for DJI Smartcontroller. It has an internal display and uses Ocusync 2.0, O3 and O3+ for video transmission. The device has 5.5" Full-hd 1920x1080px display, it doesn't have internal storage. The controller uses Android but the user cannot install apps. The weight of the controller is 390g.
Supported devices:

 Mini 3. (Ocusync 2.0)
 Mini 3 Pro and Air 2S. (O3)
 Mavic 3 Series. (O3+) 

 DJI RC Pro Enterprise Controller (RM510B) with O3E in 2022.
 It is a version of the DJI RC Pro controller which was released with Mavic 3 Enterprise Models. It has the least additional microphone as a hardware difference and larger 64GB of internal storage.
 Supported devices:  
 Mavic 3 Enterprise Series (O3E) .

Comparison 

-*a) Mini 3/3 Pro with 2453 mAh Battery.

-*b) Mini 3/3 Pro with 3850 mAh Battery Plus. 

-*c) Mini 2/2 SE with 2250 mAh Battery.

-*d) Mini SE with 2250 mAh Battery.

-*e) Mavic Mini with 2400 mAh Battery. 

-*f) Mavic Mini with 1100 mAh Battery

3rd party applications SDK support 
DJI supports a mobile SDK for developing Android and iOS applications for use with DJI drones. Some of the drones are also supported by UX SDK and Windows SDK. DJI support has stated they are prioritizing enterprise-level aircraft. There are no plans for adding SDK support to Mavic 3 or Mini 3 Pro.

Examples for 3rd party applications are mission planning, photogrammetry and mapping apps such as Lichi, DroneDeploy, Pix4D and Dronelink.

See also
DJI Phantom

References

External links  

Unmanned aerial vehicles of China
DJI